Randoon (Randún) is a Turgesius Viking fortress located southwest of Lough Lene in Ireland. The fortress is situated upon a hill in Ranaghan, dominating by its height all other ringforts in the area, and overlooking Lough Lene between the towns of Castlepollard and Collinstown. The locally used term fort refers to any of the multitude of ringforts, many of which have been overgrown by vegetation. These remain today as historical relics Early Medieval Period of Ireland and Western Europe; they protected by Irish national heritage law.

Habitat
The area supports deciduous woodland mostly of native species such as hazel (Corylus avellana), rowan (Sorbus aucuparia), ash (Fraxinus excelsior) and sessile oak (Quercus petraea). Exotic species occur occasionally, including beech (Fagus sylvatica).

The neighbouring Loughpark, Windtown woods are inhabited by wild pheasant and are a popular attraction for the local pheasant hunters.

On occasions the pochard population, which is one of the largest in Ireland, has exceeded the threshold for international importance (i.e. 3500 individual fowl).

To the west and north, the neighbouring woods are inhabited by pheasants and are a popular attraction for local hunters.

See also
 Ringforts
 Hill of Tara
 Viking

References
The above information is obtained from the Irish Department of Environment, Heritage, and Local Government. 13 September 2007.
"...Randún - a hill overlooking Lough Lene Collinstown W.Meath...", recorded by K. Molloy, found in the Glenidan Schools' Collection of the National Folklore Collection, UCD (recognised as one of Europe’s largest archives of oral tradition and cultural history, and inscribed in 2017 to the UNESCO Memory of the World Register) https://www.duchas.ie/ga/cbes/5009033/4979234/5115264
"...From the top of it can be seen three forts Ran Dún, on the northern side, one on the western side and one on the southern side..." recorded in 1938 by Dómhnaill De Bhealatúin, found in the Collinstown Schools’ Collection of the National Folklore Collection, UCD (recognised as one of Europe’s largest archives of oral tradition and cultural history, and inscribed in 2017 to the UNESCO Memory of the World Register) https://www.duchas.ie/en/cbes/5009035/4979474/5116153?ChapterID=5009035&NameKey=d%C3%B3mhnaill-de-bhealat%C3%BAin

Viking Age in Ireland
Forts in Ireland
Mountains and hills of County Westmeath
Archaeological sites in County Westmeath